Franz Hermann Otto Röhr (22 November 1891 – 8 January 1972) was a German track and field athlete who competed in the 1912 Summer Olympics. He was born in Magdeburg and died in Arnsberg.

In 1912 he finished 13th in the high jump competition. In the decathlon competition he retired after four event. He was also a member of the German relay team which was disqualified in the 4x100 metre relay competition after a fault with its second baton passing.

References

External links
Sports-Reference Profile

1891 births
1972 deaths
German male sprinters
German male high jumpers
German decathletes
Olympic athletes of Germany
Athletes (track and field) at the 1912 Summer Olympics
World record setters in athletics (track and field)
Olympic decathletes
Sportspeople from Magdeburg